Francis Curry Marty (November 12, 1889 – August 6, 1950) was an American football player and coach.  He served as the head football coach at the University of Cincinnati for one season, in 1917 season, compiling a record of 0–6. Marty also played golf and tennis.  He was later president of the General Paper Corporation.  Marty was born on November 12, 1889 in Cincinnati, Ohio.  He died of a heart attack on August 6, 1950, at his home in Fort Thomas, Kentucky.

Head coaching record

References

1880s births
1950 deaths
Cincinnati Bearcats football coaches
Kenyon Lords football players
Coaches of American football from Ohio
Players of American football from Cincinnati